Gordon Lindsay Jones (2 November 1913 – 3 December 1999) was an Australian rules footballer who played for Melbourne in the Victorian Football League (VFL).

He was the cousin of Melbourne footballers Colin Niven and Ray Niven.

A Maryborough recruit, he had a strong year in 1938 when he gathered 12 Brownlow Medal votes to finish as the best placed Melbourne player and equal ninth overall.

Jones debuted in League football with a solid performance as a ruckman in the opening round of the 1935 VFL season when Melbourne lost to Essendon 15.9 (99) to 24.15 (159).

He was primarily a follower during his career but also played at centre half back, the position in which he was a member of Melbourne's 1939 and 1940 premiership teams.

Footnotes

References
 Australian Military Forces: Attestation Form for Persons Voluntarily Enlisted in the Militia Forces: G. L. Jones (213348): Date of Birth "2nd. November 1913".
 Second World War Nominal Roll: Captain Gordon Lindsay Jones (VX39821). 
 Holmesby, Russell and Main, Jim (2007). The Encyclopedia of AFL Footballers. 7th ed. Melbourne: Bas Publishing.
 Honor Roll: Gordon Jones: Melbourne Half-Back is Champion this Week, The Sporting Globe, (Wednesday, 8 June 1938), p. 8.

External links

Demonwiki profile

1913 births
1999 deaths
Australian rules footballers from Victoria (Australia)
Melbourne Football Club players
Maryborough Football Club players
Australian Army personnel of World War II
Australian Army officers
Melbourne Football Club Premiership players
Two-time VFL/AFL Premiership players